

General Elections

Delayed elections in Assam and Punjab

Legislative Assembly elections

Arunachal Pradesh

Source:

Goa, Daman and Diu

Manipur

Mizoram

Tamilnadu

|-
!colspan=2|Alliance/Party
! Seats won
! Change
! Popular Vote
! Vote %
! Adj. %‡
|-
! style="background-color:" colspan=2|AIADMK+ alliance
| 195
| +29
| 11,681,221
| style="text-align:center;vertical-align:middle;" colspan=2 | 53.9%
|-
|
| 132
| +3
| 8,030,809
| 37.0%
| 54.3%
|-
|
| 61
| +30
| 3,529,708
| 16.3%
| 54.5%
|-
! 
| 2
| -4
| 120,704
| 0.6%
| 40.4%
|-
! style="background-color: " colspan=2|DMK+ alliance
| 34
| -25
| 8,021,293
| style="text-align:center;vertical-align:middle;" colspan=2 | 37.0%
|-
|
| 24
| -13
| 6,362,770
| 29.3%
| 40.8%
|-
|
| 5
| -6
| 597,622
| 2.8%
| 39.6%
|-
|
| 3
| +1
| 493,374
| 2.3%
| 36.4%
|-
|
| 2
| -7
| 567,527
| 2.6%
| 35.5%
|-
! style="background-color:gray" colspan=2|Others
| 5
| -4
| 1,983,959
| style="text-align:center;vertical-align:middle;" colspan=2 | 9.1%
|-
|
| 4
| -4
| 1,619,921
| 7.5%
| 7.9%
|-
|
| 1
| –
| 47,212
| 0.7%
| 57.2%
|-
|
| 0
| –
| 152,315
| 0.7%
| 34.9%
|-
|
| 0
| –
| 110,121
| 0.5%
| 3.2%
|-
|
| 0
| –
| 54,390
| 0.3%
| 3.7%
|-
! style="background-color: " |
| style="text-align:center;" |Total
| 234
| –
| 21,686,473
| 100%
| style="text-align:center;" | –
|-
|}
‡: Vote % reflects the percentage of votes the party received compared to the entire electorate that voted in this election. Adjusted (Adj.) Vote %, reflects the % of votes the party received per constituency that they contested.
Sources: ECI

References

External links

 Election Commission of India

1984 elections in India
India
1984 in India
Elections in India by year